Ulu Bedok Constituency was a constituency in Singapore that existed from 1955 to 1959. 

The constituency was formed in 1955, covering the areas of  Bedok, Kembangan and Geylang Serai. The word ulu in Malay means remote as the eastern region of Singapore was undeveloped at that time. In 1959, the constituency was abolished.

Member of Parliament

Elections

Elections in the 1950s

See also
Bedok SMC
Bedok GRC

References

1955 GE's result
Map of Ulu Bedok ward in 1955
Map of Geylang Serai, Kampong Kembangan and Tampines ward in 1959
Brief History on Singapore Alliance

Singaporean electoral divisions
Tampines